Valvata is a genus of very small freshwater snails with an operculum, aquatic gastropod mollusks in the family Valvatidae, the valve snails.

Synonyms
 Cincinna Hübner, 1810 · accepted, alternate representation (Cincinna is treated as subgenus of Valvata)
 Cincinna (Atropidina) Lindholm, 1906 (subgenus-genus combination invalid; Atropidina is considered a junior synonym of Tropidina or Cincinna (depending on source); to avoid problems we refer to Valvata only)
 Cincinna (Cincinna) Hübner, 1810 (Cincinna is treated as subgenus of Valvata)
 Gyrorbis Fitzinger, 1833 (junior synonym (?))
 Planorbis (Gyrorbis) Fitzinger, 1833 (junior synonym (?))
 Valvata (Atropidina) Lindholm, 1906 (type species of Atropidina (Valvata pulchella Studer, 1789) is considered a junior synonym of V. (Cincinna) piscinalis; however, FE ranks Atropidina as synonym of Tropidina (type species: V. macrostoma Mörch, 1864); to avoid problems we refer to Valvata)

Species
Species in the genus: Valvata O.F. Müller, 1773 include:

(All the European species are included in this list.)
 Subgenus † Valvata (Aphanotylus) Brusina, 1894 
 † Valvata (Aphanotylus) adeorboides Fuchs, 1870 
 † Valvata (Aphanotylus) cossmanni (Brusina, 1894) 
 † Valvata (Aphanotylus) fuchsi (Brusina, 1894) 
 † Valvata (Aphanotylus) hellenica Tournouër in Fischer, 1877 
 † Valvata (Aphanotylus) kupensis Fuchs, 1870 
 † Valvata (Aphanotylus) moesiensis Jekelius, 1944 
 † Valvata (Aphanotylus) ristici (Pavlović, 1931) 
 Subgenus: Cincinna Hübner, 1810
 † Valvata (Cincinna) almerai Almera, 1894 
 † Valvata (Cincinna) balizacensis (Degrange-Touzin, 1892) 
 † Valvata (Cincinna) banatica Brusina, 1902 
 Valvata (Cincinna) biwaensis Preston, 1916 = Biwakovalvata biwaensis
 † Valvata (Cincinna) bouei Pavlović, 1903 
 † Valvata (Cincinna) bugensis (Gozhik in Gozhik & Datsenko, 2007) 
 † Valvata (Cincinna) bukowskii Brusina, 1897 
 † Valvata (Cincinna) carasiensis Jekelius, 1944
 † Valvata (Cincinna) chalinei Schlickum & Puisségur, 1978
 † Valvata (Cincinna) cobalcescui Brusina, 1885 
 † Valvata (Cincinna) connectens Brusina, 1892 
 † Valvata (Cincinna) costatus Taner, 1974 
 † Valvata (Cincinna) crusitensis Fontannes, 1887 
 † Valvata (Cincinna) deshayesi Denainvilliers, 1875†
 † Valvata (Cincinna) eugeniae Neumayr in Herbich & Neumayr, 1875 
 † Valvata (Cincinna) fossaruliformis Brusina, 1902 
 † Valvata (Cincinna) furlici Brusina, 1897 
 † Valvata (Cincinna) giraudi Dollfus, 1908 
 †  Valvata (Cincinna) hoernesi Penecke, 1886 
 † Valvata (Cincinna) ilici Brusina, 1897 
 † Valvata (Cincinna) interposita de Stefani, 1880 
 † Valvata (Cincinna) jaccardi Locard, 1893 
 † Valvata (Cincinna) jalpuchensis (Gozhik, 2002) 
 † Valvata (Cincinna) larteti Bourguignat, 1881 
 † Valvata (Cincinna) lessonae Sacco, 1886 
 † Valvata (Cincinna) lorentheyi Wenz, 1928 
 † Valvata (Cincinna) lucici Brusina, 1902 
 † Valvata (Cincinna) molnarae Soós in Bartha & Soós, 1955 
 † Valvata (Cincinna) neglecta Brusina, 1902 
 † Valvata (Cincinna) orientalis Fischer in Tchihatcheff, 1866 
 † Valvata (Cincinna) paviai Schlickum & Strauch, 1979 
 † Valvata (Cincinna) peneckei Brusina, 1892 
 † Valvata (Cincinna) petronijevici Milošević, 1973 
 Valvata (Cincinna) piscinalis (O.F. Müller, 1774) - European stream valvata
 Valvata (Cincinna) piscinalis piscinalis (O.F. Müller, 1774) - European stream valvata
 Valvata (Cincinna) piscinalis alpestris (Küster, 1853)
 Valvata (Cincinna) piscinalis antiqua (Morris, 1838)
 Valvata (Cincinna) piscinalis discors Westerlund, 1886
 Valvata (Cincinna) piscinalis geyeri (Menzel, 1904)
 † Valvata (Cincinna) piscinaloidis Michaud, 1855
 † Valvata (Cincinna) pontica Pană, 1990 
 † Valvata (Cincinna) praepiscinalis (Gozhik in Gozhik & Datsenko, 2007) 
 † Valvata (Cincinna) prutulensis (Gozhik in Gozhik & Datsenko, 2007) 
 † Valvata (Cincinna) pseudoalpestris Brusina, 1902 
 † Valvata (Cincinna) radiatula Sandberger, 1875 
 Valvata (Cincinna) saulcyi Bourguignat, 1853
 † Valvata (Cincinna) sibinensis Neumayr in Neumayr & Paul, 1875 
 † Valvata (Cincinna) soceni Jekelius, 1944 
 Valvata (Cincinna) stenotrema Polinski, 1929
 † Valvata (Cincinna) stiriaca Rolle, 1860 
 Valvata (Cincinna) studeri Boeters & Falkner, 1998
 † Valvata (Cincinna) subcarinata Brusina, 1878
 † Valvata (Cincinna) tihanyensis Lörenthey, 1906 
 † Valvata (Cincinna) unicarinata Lörenthey, 1893 
 † Valvata (Cincinna) vallestris Fontannes, 1876 
 † Valvata (Cincinna) vanciana Tournouër, 1875 
 † Valvata (Cincinna) variabilis Fuchs, 1870 
 † Valvata (Cincinna) varians Lörenthey, 1902 
 † Valvata (Cincinna) vinogradovkaensis (Gozhik, 2002) 
 † Valvata (Cincinna) vivipariformis Oppenheim, 1891 
 † Valvata (Cincinna) vrabceana Gorjanović-Kramberger, 1890 
 Cincinna japonica
 Cincinna kizakikoensis
 Subgenus: Costovalvata Polinski, 1929
 Valvata (Costovalvata) hirsutecostata Polinski, 1929
 Valvata (Costovalvata) klemmi Schütt, 1962
 † Valvata (Costovalvata) pagana Bulić & Jurišić-Polšak, 2009 
 Valvata (Costovalvata) rhabdota Sturany, 1894
 Subgenus: Ohridotropidina Hadžišce 1955
 Valvata (Ohridotropidina) relicta (Polinski, 1929)
 Subgenus: Tropidina H. &. A. Adams, 1854
 Valvata (Tropidina) pulchella Studer, 1820
 † Valvata (Tropidina) salebrosa Meijer, 1990
 Valvata (Tropidina) bicarinata I. Lea, 1841 - two-ridge valvata
 Subgenus: Valvata O.F. Müller, 1773
 † Valvata (Valvata) abdita Brusina, 1902 
 † Valvata (Valvata) aphanotylopsis Brusina, 1902 
 Valvata (Valvata) cristata O.F. Müller, 1774
 † Valvata (Valvata) cyclostoma (Brusina, 1902) 
 † Valvata (Valvata) cyclostrema Brusina, 1892 
 † Valvata (Valvata) debilis Fuchs, 1870 
 † Valvata (Valvata) euristoma Brusina, 1902
 † Valvata (Valvata) exotica Papp, 1954 
 Valvata (Valvata) hokkaidoensis Miyadi, 1935
 † Valvata (Valvata) homalogyra Brusina, 1874 
 † Valvata (Valvata) kochi Pavlović, 1932 
 † Valvata (Valvata) leptonema Brusina, 1892 
 † Valvata (Valvata) marginata Michaud, 1855 
 † Valvata (Valvata) palmotici Brusina, 1902 
 † Valvata (Valvata) pisidica Oppenheim, 1919 
 † Valvata (Valvata) sulekiana Brusina, 1874
 † Valvata (Valvata) symmetra (Ludwig, 1865) 
 † Valvata (Valvata) toplicani Milošević, 1984 
 † Valvata (Valvata) tournoueri Capellini, 1880
 Subgenus: ? (not know yet)
 Valvata montenegrina Gloër & Pešić, 2007

 Subgenus: ? (not known for Wikipedians)
 Valvata aliena Westerlund, 1877
 Valvata ambigua Westerlund, 1873
 † Valvata avia (Eichwald, 1853) 
 † Valvata cincta Taner, 1974 
 † Valvata gregaria Bukowski, 1896 
 † Valvata heidemariae Willmann, 1981 
 † Valvata helicoides Stoliczka, 1862 
 Valvata humeralis Say, 1829 - glossy valvata
 † Valvata incerta Yen, 1947 - late Cenozoic
 Valvata inflata Sandberger, 1875 
 † Valvata kamirensis Willmann, 1981 
 † Valvata kavusani Schütt in Schütt & Kavuşan, 1984 
 † Valvata kubanica Krestovnikov, 1931 
 Valvata lewisi Currier, 1868 - fringed valvata
 Valvata macrostoma (Mörch, 1864)
 Valvata mergella Westerlund, 1883 - rams-horn valvata
 † Valvata moguntina (Boettger, 1884) 
 Valvata montenegrina Glöer & Pešić, 2008
 † Valvata multicarinata Yen, 1946 - from Tertiary
 Valvata normalis S. Walker
 Valvata nowshahrensis Glöer & Pešić, 2012
 † Valvata obtusaeformis Lörenthey, 1906 
 † Valvata ocsensis Soós, 1934 
 † Valvata oregonensis Hanna, 1922
 † Valvata paula Pierce, 1993
 Valvata perdepressa Walker, 1906 - purplecap valvata
 † Valvata planconcava Pavlović, 1927 
 † Valvata politioanei Jekelius, 1944 
 † Valvata polystriata Pavlović, 1927 
 † Valvata procera Russell, 1952 - from Oligocene
 † Valvata pseudoadeorbis Sinzov, 1880 
 † Valvata radovanovici Pavlović, 1931 
 † Valvata semigradata Pavlović, 1927 
 Valvata sibirica Middendorff, 1851
 Valvata simusyuensis
 Valvata sincera Say, 1824 - mossy valvata
 † Valvata singularis (Gozhik in Gozhik & Datsenko, 2007) 
 † Valvata skhiadica Bukowski, 1896 
 † Valvata striolata Pavlović, 1927 
 † Valvata subbiformis Gozhik in Gozhik & Prysjazhnjuk, 1978 
 † Valvata subgradata Lörenthey, 1902 
 † Valvata subumbilicata (Meek & Hayden, 1856) - from Middle Cenozoic (Oligocene)
 Valvata tricarinata (Say, 1817) - three-ridge valvata, threeridge valvata
 † Valvata turislavica Jekelius, 1944 
 Valvata utahensis Call, 1884 - Utah roundmouth snail
 † Valvata velitzelosi Schütt in Schütt & Velitzelos, 1991 
 Valvata virens Tryon, 1863 - emerald valvata
 † Valvata wenzi Papp, 1953 
 † Valvata windhauseni Parodiz, 1961<ref>Parodiz J. J. (July) 1961. Notes on Valvatidae from early Tertiary of South America, with a new species. [https://archive.org/details/nautilus75amer The Nautilus, volume 75(1)]. pages 16-19.</ref>
 Valvata winnebagoensis F. C. Baker, 1928 - flanged valvata

Species brought into synonymy
  † Valvata euomphalus Fuchs, 1877: synonym of † Graecamnicola euomphalus (Fuchs, 1877)
 † Valvata (Aphanotylus) pseudoadeorboides Sinzov, 1880: synonym of † Valvata pseudoadeorbis Sinzov, 1880 
 † Valvata (Cincinna) gaudryana Tournouër, 1866: synonym of † Valvata inflata Sandberger, 1875 
 † Valvata (Valvata) simplex bicincta Fuchs, 1870: synonym of † Muellerpalia bicincta (Fuchs, 1870)

 References 

 Vaught, K.C. (1989). A classification of the living Mollusca.'' American Malacologists: Melbourne, FL (USA). . XII, 195 pp.

External links 

 Valvata in The Paleobiology Database

Valvatidae
Taxonomy articles created by Polbot